The following is a John McLaughlin discography, grouped by albums released under his name, the Miles Davis albums which he played on, albums from his group Mahavishnu Orchestra, his group Shakti, and albums where he is a session player on other artist's releases.

Solo albums

Collaborative albums

Live albums

Other appearances

With Mahavishnu Orchestra

With Shakti

With Remember Shakti

References 

Jazz discographies
Discographies of British artists